Frederick William Robin Smith, 3rd Earl of Birkenhead (17 April 1936 – 16 February 1985) was a British writer, historian and hereditary peer. He wrote under the pseudonym Robin Furneaux.

Biography
Viscount Furneaux was his courtesy title prior to the 1975 death of his father, Frederick Smith, 2nd Earl of Birkenhead, at which time he succeeded to the earldom. His grandfather, F. E. Smith, 1st Earl of Birkenhead, had been a British Lord Chancellor and a close personal friend of Winston Churchill.

Writing under his pen name of Robin Furneaux, Lord Birkenhead won the Heinemann Award in 1975 for William Wilberforce, his biography of the antislavery campaigner. He also was known for his 1970 book The Amazon: The Story of a Great River, based on an expedition he made along the Amazon River in 1968.

Lord Birkenhead was a contract bridge player, participating in an annual competition between members of the House of Lords and the House of Commons. He was part of a British team that visited Washington, D.C., in 1984 and defeated an American team including Supreme Court Justice John Paul Stevens.

He died of a heart attack aged 48 whilst playing real tennis at the Leamington Spa Tennis and Squash Club. The title became extinct upon his death.

Arms

References

External links 
Robin Furneaux at WorldCat

1936 births
1985 deaths
Earls in the Peerage of the United Kingdom
20th-century English male writers